I Love N.Y. is a  1987 American semi-autobiographical comedy-drama film written and directed by fine-art photographer Gianni Bozzacchi as Alan Smithee.

Plot 
Mario Cotone (Baio) is an American-Italian struggling photographer who meets and falls in love with Nicole Yeats (Van der Velden), a pretty young debutante and the daughter of stage actor John R. Yeats (Plummer).

Cast 
Scott Baio as Mario Cotone 
Kelly Van der Velden as Nicole Yeats
Christopher Plummer as John Robertson Yeats
Jennifer O'Neill as Irene
Virna Lisi as Anna Cotone, Mario's mother
Jerry Orbach as Leo
John Armstead as Charlie
Lisanne Falk as Linda
 Jusak Bernhard  as Kem
 Morgan Most as Veronica (credited as Morgan Hart)
 Cyrus Elias  as Kurt Thompson
Mickey Knox as Charles Mitchell
 Penny Brown as Katherine Mitchell
 John Karlsen as The  Butler 
Larry Dolgin  as The Mayor

References

External links

1987 films
1987 comedy-drama films
Films set in New York City
American comedy-drama films
Films credited to Alan Smithee
Films scored by Bill Conti
1980s English-language films
1980s American films